Albert Watson (1 June 1918 – 22 October 2009) was a professional footballer, who played for Huddersfield Town and Oldham Athletic. He was born in Bolton on Dearne, near Barnsley, Yorkshire. For many years he had a sports shop in Sunderland trading as Willie Watson Sports, and he died in Sunderland in 2009.

References

External links 
 
 Albert Watson's obituary

1918 births
2009 deaths
English footballers
People from Bolton upon Dearne
Association football wing halves
English Football League players
Huddersfield Town A.F.C. players
Oldham Athletic A.F.C. players
Footballers from Yorkshire